In abstract algebra, in particular in the theory of nondegenerate quadratic forms on vector spaces, the structures of finite-dimensional real and complex Clifford algebras for a nondegenerate quadratic form have been completely classified. In each case, the Clifford algebra is algebra isomorphic to a full matrix ring over R, C, or H (the quaternions), or to a direct sum of two copies of such an algebra, though not in a canonical way. Below it is shown that distinct Clifford algebras may be algebra-isomorphic, as is the case of Cl2,0(R) and Cl1,1(R), which are both isomorphic as rings to the ring of two-by-two matrices over the real numbers.

Notation and conventions 
The Clifford product is the manifest ring product for the Clifford algebra, and all algebra homomorphisms in this article are with respect to this ring product. Other products defined within Clifford algebras, such as the exterior product, are not used here. This article uses the (+) sign convention for Clifford multiplication so that

Bott periodicity 
Clifford algebras exhibit a 2-fold periodicity over the complex numbers and an 8-fold periodicity over the real numbers, which is related to the same periodicities for homotopy groups of the stable unitary group and stable orthogonal group, and is called Bott periodicity. The connection is explained by the geometric model of loop spaces approach to Bott periodicity: their 2-fold/8-fold periodic embeddings of the classical groups in each other (corresponding to isomorphism groups of Clifford algebras), and their successive quotients are symmetric spaces which are homotopy equivalent to the loop spaces of the unitary/orthogonal group.

Complex case 
The complex case is particularly simple: every nondegenerate quadratic form on a complex vector space is equivalent to the standard diagonal form

where , so there is essentially only one Clifford algebra in each dimension. We will denote the Clifford algebra on Cn with the standard quadratic form by Cln(C).

There are two separate cases to consider, according to whether n is even or odd. When n is even the algebra Cln(C) is central simple and so by the Artin–Wedderburn theorem is isomorphic to a matrix algebra over C. When n is odd, the center includes not only the scalars but the pseudoscalars (degree n elements) as well. We can always find a normalized pseudoscalar ω such that . Define the operators

These two operators form a complete set of orthogonal idempotents, and since they are central they give a decomposition of Cln(C) into a direct sum of two algebras

where

The algebras  are just the positive and negative eigenspaces of ω and the P± are just the projection operators. Since ω is odd, these algebras are mixed by α (the linear map on V defined by ):

and therefore isomorphic (since α is an automorphism). These two isomorphic algebras are each central simple and so, again, isomorphic to a matrix algebra over C. The sizes of the matrices can be determined from the fact that the dimension of Cln(C) is 2n. What we have then is the following table:

The even subalgebra of Cln(C) is (non-canonically) isomorphic to Cln−1(C). When n is even, the even subalgebra can be identified with the block diagonal matrices (when partitioned into 2×2 block matrix).

Real case 
The real case is significantly more complicated, exhibiting a periodicity of 8 rather than 2, and there is a 2-parameter family of Clifford algebras.

Classification of quadratic forms 
Firstly, there are non-isomorphic quadratic forms of a given degree, classified by signature.

Every nondegenerate quadratic form on a real vector space is equivalent to the standard diagonal form:

where  is the dimension of the vector space. The pair of integers (p, q) is called the signature of the quadratic form. The real vector space with this quadratic form is often denoted Rp,q. The Clifford algebra on Rp,q is denoted Clp,q(R).

A standard orthonormal basis {ei} for Rp,q consists of  mutually orthogonal vectors, p of which have norm +1 and q of which have norm −1.

Unit pseudoscalar 

The unit pseudoscalar in Clp,q(R) is defined as

This is both a Coxeter element of sorts (product of reflections) and a longest element of a Coxeter group in the Bruhat order; this is an analogy. It corresponds to and generalizes a volume form (in the exterior algebra; for the trivial quadratic form, the unit pseudoscalar is a volume form), and lifts reflection through the origin (meaning that the image of the unit pseudoscalar is reflection through the origin, in the orthogonal group).

To compute the square , one can either reverse the order of the second group, yielding , or apply a perfect shuffle, yielding .

Note that, unlike the complex case, it is not in general possible to find a pseudoscalar that squares to +1.

Center 
If n (equivalently) is even, the algebra Clp,q(R) is central simple and so isomorphic to a matrix algebra over R or H by the Artin–Wedderburn theorem.

If n (equivalently) is odd then the algebra is no longer central simple but rather has a center which includes the pseudoscalars as well as the scalars.

each of which is central simple and so isomorphic to matrix algebra over R or H.

As a complex algebra, it is central simple and so isomorphic to a matrix algebra over C.

Classification 
All told there are three properties which determine the class of the algebra Clp,q(R):
 signature mod 2: n is even/odd: central simple or not
 signature mod 8: the Brauer class of the algebra (n even) or even subalgebra (n odd) is R or H
Each of these properties depends only on the signature  modulo 8. The complete classification table is given below. The size of the matrices is determined by the requirement that Clp,q(R) have dimension 2p+q.

It may be seen that of all matrix ring types mentioned, there is only one type shared between both complex and real algebras: the type M(2m,C). For example, Cl2(C) and Cl3,0(R) are both determined to be M2(C). It is important to note that there is a difference in the classifying isomorphisms used. Since the Cl2(C) is algebra isomorphic via a C-linear map (which is necessarily R-linear), and Cl3,0(R) is algebra isomorphic via an R-linear map, Cl2(C) and Cl3,0(R) are R-algebra isomorphic.

A table of this classification for  follows. Here  runs vertically and  runs horizontally (e.g. the algebra  is found in row 4, column −2).

Symmetries 
There is a tangled web of symmetries and relationships in the above table.

Going over 4 spots in any row yields an identical algebra.

From these Bott periodicity follows:

If the signature satisfies  then

(The table is symmetric about columns with signature ..., −7, −3, 1, 5, ...)

Thus if the signature satisfies ,

See also 
 Dirac algebra Cl1,3(C)
 Pauli algebra Cl3,0(R)
 Spacetime algebra Cl1,3(R)
 Clifford module
 Spin representation

References 

 
 
 

Ring theory
Clifford algebras
Mathematical classification systems